Boris Asafovich Messerer (born March 15, 1933, Moscow) is a Soviet and Russian theater artist, set designer and teacher. President of the association of artists of theater, cinema and television in Moscow.

Academician of the Russian Academy of Arts (1997, Corresponding Member of 1990). People's Artist of the Russian Federation (1993). Winner of two State Prizes of the Russian Federation (1995, 2002). Member of the USSR Union of Artists in 1960, Union of Theatre Workers of the Russian Federation and Union of Cinematographers of the Russian Federation. In 2016 he became a member of the Board of Trustees Fazil Iskander International Literary Award

Family 
He was born to ballet dancer and teacher Asaf Messerer and silent film actress Anel Sudakevich. The ballerina Sulamith Messerer and the actress Rachel Messerer were his paternal aunts. Through his aunt Rachel he was cousin to Maya Plisetskaya, Alexander Plisetski and Azari Plisetski.

He was married twice. From his first wife, Nina Chistova, he had his only child, Alexander Messerer. His son is a painter and he has seven children. His second wife was poet and translator Bella Akhmadulina. They were married from 1974 to her death in 2010. Boris was her fourth husband.

Awards
 1995 —  State Prize of the Russian Federation in the field of fine art
 2001 —  Gold Medal of the Russian Academy of Arts
2002 —  State Prize of the Russian Federation in the field of design
 2003 —  Order of Honour
 2008 —  Crystal Turandot
 2008 —  Order "For Merit to the Fatherland" 4th class 
 2013 —  Order of Friendship

References

External links
 Страница  на сайте  РАХ 
 ТВ-интервью 2009 года 

1933 births
Living people
Theatre people from Moscow
Russian Jews
Plisetski–Messerer family
Russian scenic designers
Recipients of the Order of Honour (Russia)
State Prize of the Russian Federation laureates
Academicians of the Russian Academy of Cinema Arts and Sciences "Nika"
Full Members of the Russian Academy of Arts